Avelãs de Cima is a village and a civil parish of the municipality of Anadia, Portugal. The population in 2011 was 2,185, in an area of 40.58 km2.

References

Freguesias of Anadia, Portugal